Lepa is a feminine given name. Notable people with the name include:

 Lepa Brena (born 1960), Bosnian singer, actress, and businesswoman
 Lepa Lukić (born 1940), Serbian singer
 Lepa Mladjenovic, Serbian activist
 Lepa Radić (1925–1943), Yugoslav Partisans member

Feminine given names